Wojtek Fibak and Tom Okker were the defending champions.

Fibak and Okker successfully defended their title, defeating Bob Lutz and Stan Smith 6–3, 6–2 in the final.

Seeds

Draw

Finals

Top half

Bottom half

External links
 Draw

Stockholm Open
1978 Grand Prix (tennis)